The Taekwondo competition in the 2009 Summer Universiade were held in Belgrade, Serbia.

Medal overview

Men's events

Women's events

Mixed events

Medal table

External links
Medal Report

2009 Summer Universiade
Universiade
2009